Virtual instrument may refer to:

 A Software synthesizer, a computer program or plug-in that generates digital audio
 A program that implements functions of an instrument by computer, sensors and actuators, see Virtual instrumentation

See also
 VI (disambiguation)